Shyer is a surname. Notable people with the name include:

Charles Shyer (born 1951), American filmmaker
Christopher Shyer, Canadian actor
Hallie Meyers-Shyer (born 1987), American film actress, director and writer
Melville Shyer (1895–1968), American film director, screenwriter and producer

See also
Shire (disambiguation)
Shy (disambiguation)
Shier, a surname